2015–16 Malaysia Purple League (also known as Resorts World Genting Purple League for sponsorship reasons) is the second edition of Malaysia Purple League. It started on 4 November 2015 and concluded on 17 January 2016. It consisted of 66 league ties (each tie consisting of 5 matches) in Stage 1. Top eight teams in Stage 1, then progressing to the finals stage.

Squads

Standings

References

Malaysia Purple League
Badminton League
Badminton tournaments in Malaysia